Rocío Sánchez Pérez (born 18 October 1961) is a Mexican politician affiliated with the Party of the Democratic Revolution. As of 2014 she served as Deputy of the LIX Legislature of the Mexican Congress representing the Federal District.

References

1961 births
Living people
People from Mexico City
Women members of the Chamber of Deputies (Mexico)
Members of the Chamber of Deputies (Mexico)
Party of the Democratic Revolution politicians